In Cauda Semper Stat Venenum is the debut album by Italian rock band Jacula. Self-released by the band in 1969 on their Gnome label, the album was released by Black Widow Records in 2001 in a highly edited version (according to guitarist and bandleader Bartoccetti) featuring Pro Tools, distorted guitars and samplers. The album has a dark and gothic sound.

Track listing
Ritus (4:06)
Magister Dixit (10:30)
Triumphatus Sad (3:35)
Veneficium (2:21)
Initiatio (6:49)
In Cauda Semper Stat Venenum (10:05)

Personnel
 Antonio Bartoccetti - guitar, bass guitar, vocals
 Charles Tiring - keyboards
 Doris Norton - drums, special effects, violin, flute, vocals

References 

Italian-language albums
Latin-language albums
Antonious Rex albums
Black Widow Records albums
1969 albums
Self-released albums